Wayne Blackman (born 25 December 1975) is a Barbadian cricketer. He played in fifteen first-class and seven List A matches for the Barbados cricket team from 1999 to 2007.

See also
 List of Barbadian representative cricketers

References

External links
 

1975 births
Living people
Barbadian cricketers
Barbados cricketers
People from Saint James, Barbados